The Zerevani (meaning "Guard" or "Guardian") (or Zeravani, sometimes Zeravani Army) are the militarized police force (described as a gendarmerie by some) operated by Kurdistan Regional Government and the Iraqi Government.

Organization and Mission 
The Zeravani are under the operational control of the Kurdish Ministry of the Interior but are a part of the Peshmerga (armed forces), and provide security for government and industrial property and support to civilian police & the military. The first Commanding Chief of Zerevani was Faridun Jwanroyi, Fraydoon resigned in 2010 and Aziz Weysi Bani was assigned as the Major General of the Zerevani.

The Zeravani were established in 1997 by the KDP in order to support the police and Asaysh forces; according to Major General Aziz Waisi, the Zeravani's role over the years expanded to also protect electricity stations and water resources, as well as embassies, consulates, government offices and other sensitive targets.

According to Stratfor, as of 2004 two Zeravani divisions (totaling 30,000 troops) were established in the Iraqi Federal Police. In 2011, the Zeravani strength was of 47,000, while as of 2017, Zeravani strength is of 51,000; among these, there are several Iraqi Christians.

Zeravani accepts recruits aged between 18 and 27. They need to provide an Iraqi national ID and food coupons, to be literate, to have a clean record and a recommendation in terms of moral and loyalty issues; women are allowed to serve.

Issues 
In June 2008, the Zeravani were the subject of an Amnesty International campaign after the alleged kidnap of a Kurdish journalist. According to Canadian website McLeans.ca, the Zeravani are considered loyal to the ruling Kurdistan Democratic Party; according to Major General Aziz Waisi, all political activities are forbidden within the Zeravani, although party membership is allowed.

International training and operations 
In November 2009, the Zerevani began training conducted alongside the Iraqi Federal Police, in order to conduct effective police work and counter-insurgency operations. Since 2014, also the Zeravani have undergone training with the Combined Joint Task Force – Operation Inherent Resolve. The Zerevani training is conducted primarily by the Italian Carabinieri, but also by Canadian, British, German, Dutch, Norwegian, Finnish and Hungarian forces. As of 2016, the Zerevani were also trained by Italian Army

A Zeravani division led by Colonel Abu Rish was fighting against ISIS near Mosul during summer 2015; in 2016 the Zeravani, according to Colonel Abdularrahman Hassan, still occupied frontline positions around Mosul.

Current equipment of the Peshmerga 
Because Zerevani forces were low on equipment when they began training, the Peshmerga army donated some of their weapons to the Zerevani. The Kurdistan Regional Government set them up a base and allowed them to buy their own weapons. They are usually armed with AKMs, RPKs (light Soviet machine guns) and DShKs (heavy Soviet machine guns). Some Zervani companies are however armed with American rifles (M4A1 and M16)
 Individual weapons
 assault rifle
 AKM (assault rifle – 7.62×39mm)
 Zastava M92 (assault rifle – 7.62×39mm)
 AK-74 (assault rifle – 5.45×39mm)
 Heckler & Koch G3 (battle Rifle – 7.62×51mm)
 M16 (assault rifle – 5.56×45mm)
 M4A1 (assault rifle/carbine – 5.56×45mm)
 Sniper Rifle
 SVD Dragunov (sniper rifle – 7.62×54mmR)
 M-40A1 (sniper rifle – 7.62×51mm)
 Barrett M82A1 (sniper rifle – 12.7×99mm)
 Tabuk Sniper Rifle (sniper rifle – 7.62×39mm)
 M-24 SWS (sniper rifle – 7.62×51mm )
 Dragunov SVU (sniper rifle – 7.62×54mmR)
 Zastava M91 (sniper rifle – 7.62×54mmR)
 PSG1 (sniper rifle – 7.62×51mm)
 Anti-tank explosive
 RPG-7 (rocket-propelled grenade launcher – 40 mm)
 RPG-29 (rocket-propelled grenade launcher – 105 mm)
 AT4 (rocket-propelled grenade launcher – 84 mm)
 AT-4 Spigot (rocket-propelled grenade launcher – 120 mm)
 Vehicles
 Main battle tanks
T-34 – 11 tanks inherited from the Mahabad Republic – destroyed in 1965–66.
M4 Sherman – 3 tanks captured from Iranian Army in 1946 – destroyed in 1965–66.
M47 Patton – 8 tanks (originally Iranian) captured from Iraqi Army in 1991
 T-54/T-55 – 21 tanks captured from the Iraqi Army in 1991 and 27 tanks captured from the Iraqi Army in 2003. 8 tanks destroyed during the 1990s and 6 tanks destroyed in the fight against ISIS
 T-62 – 16 tanks captured from Mosul in 2003.
 T-72 – 17 tanks captured in 1991 (5 destroyed in 1992 and 4 destroyed in fight against ISIS)
 Military trucks
 GAZ-66 (4×4 2-tons)
 Humvee
 Pickup trucks
 Toyota Hilux (4×4 "4Runner")
 Nissan Titan
 Defender-110
 Anti-aircraft guns
 ZU-23-2 – 16 pieces captured from Iraqi Army in 1991.
 85 mm air defense gun M1939 (52-K) – 10 pieces inherited from the Republic of Mahabad and 18 further pieces donated by the Soviet Union in 1961–62.
 AZP S-60 57 mm Guns – 12 pieces donated by the Soviet Union in 1957 and 1963, 18 pieces captured from Iraqi Army in 1991 and 24 pieces in 2003.
 ZSU-23-4 – 21 pieces captured from Iraqi Army in 2003.

See also 
 Parastin (intelligence service)
 Asayish (security service)
 Peshmerga (armed forces)

References 

Law enforcement in Iraq
Kurdistan Region (Iraq)
Gendarmerie
Military units and formations established in 2006
2006 establishments in Iraqi Kurdistan